King Kaiser Daliwonga Mathanzima, misspelled Matanzima (15 June 1915 – 15 June 2003), was the long-term leader of Transkei. In 1950, when South Africa was offered to establish the Bantu Authorities Act, Matanzima convinced the Bunga to accept the Act. The Bunga were the council of Transkei chiefs, who at first rejected the Act until 1955 when Matanzima persuaded them.

Early life and education
Born in Qamata, Eastern Cape, a brother of George Matanzima and a nephew of Nelson Mandela, Mathanzima spent part of his childhood at the homestead of Chief Falo Mgudlwa, a repository of Thembu history and lore. He received the name Daliwonga (meaning "Maker of Majesty") upon reaching manhood as an "isikhahlelo" (praise name). Mathanzima studied law at Fort Hare University and completed his articles in the Transkei capital, Mthatha, in 1948. However, he never practiced law, instead, he involved himself in Thembu and Transkei politics.

Political career
Made paramount chief of the "Emigrant Thembus", a breakaway and sub-group to the Thembus, Mathanzima's support of the South African government's Bantu Authorities Act (1951), which looked to foster traditional African leadership structures, gave the Act credibility in the eyes of many chiefs, but saw him part ways with Mandela politically (although the two initially remained friends, with Mathanzima acting as best man at Mandela's wedding).

Relationship with South African government
In his 1975 book Independence My Way, Mathanzima argued that emancipation would come through a federation of semi-autonomous black states, such as Transkei, rather than through the militant nationalism espoused by the African National Congress (ANC). Mandela condemned Mathanzima as a de facto supporter of apartheid.

Mathanzima became a member of the United Transkeian Territorial Council in 1955 and an Executive Council member of the newly created Transkeian Territorial Authority (TTA) in 1956.  In 1961 he graduated to Chairman of the TTA, survived an assassination attempt in December 1962 by members of the Pan Africanist Congress, and in 1963 was an obvious candidate for Chief Minister of the newly formed Transkeian Legislative Assembly.  Mathanzima was not a popular vote for everyone because of his strong support of apartheid. Mathanzima and his brother George founded the Transkei National Independence Party, led it to election victories in 1968 and 1973, and was sworn in as Prime Minister in 1976 when Transkei became the first bantustan to gain nominal independence. According to an article published in Time Magazine at the time, though Transkei declared independence theoretically as a "free state", Mathanzima ruled the territory as a de facto puppet-state dictator, banning local opposition parties and buying at subsidized prices Transkei farmlands offered by the South African government.

Mathanzima clashed with the South African government over various issues, mostly connected with territorial demands made by Mathanzima.  This led to his announcement on 2 February 1978 that Transkei would break all diplomatic ties with South Africa, including the non-aggression pact between them. He ordered that all South African Defence Force members seconded to the Transkei Army leave Transkei by 31 March. But he soon backed down in the face of Transkei's dependence on South African economic aid.

Presidency
In 1979, after the death of AmaMpondo King Botha Sigcau, Mathanzima became State President, with his brother George as Prime Minister. Their approach included jailing protesters and banning such opposition parties as, in 1980, the Democratic Progressive Party.  That party's leader, AbaThembu King Sabata Dalindyebo, was convicted of "violating the dignity" of President Mathanzima, but escaped to Zambia and joined the ANC.

Mandela's father-in-law was a member of the Transkei cabinet, and Mathanzima attempted to persuade Mandela to accept exile in Transkei in lieu of imprisonment.  Mandela not only refused but declined to see Mathanzima during his imprisonment on Robben Island, fearing that such a meeting would legitimize the bantustans to the international community.

However, in common with other bantustan leaders, Mathanzima did not shy away from criticism of South Africa's racial policies and called for the repeal of Apartheid legislation (which were repealed in bantustans that were nominally independent), and occasionally pressed for a federal system for South Africa.

Retirement
On 20 February 1986, faced with South African evidence of corruption, Mathanzima was forced to retire as President, although he tried to claim that he wanted to spend more time dealing with family affairs. Kaiser Mathanzima was replaced as President by his brother, George Mathanzima, who resigned later on because he too had been accused of being corrupt. Kaiser Mathanzima was still described as Transkei's effective leader for a time, but the two soon fell out and Kaiser was temporarily detained in the Transkei gaols in 1987; upon release, he was restricted to Qamata.

Death
Mathanzima died in Queenstown on his 88th birthday. He received an official funeral, but not a state one as former allies and supporters had hoped. The continued mixed feelings toward him in South Africa were reflected in then President Thabo Mbeki's eulogy for him. Although Mathanzima was said to have been a harsh ruler, Mbeki looked at the positive legacies that Mathanzima left behind. Mbeki praised Mathanzima's dream of eliminating poverty in South Africa as well as seeing all South Africans citizens educated. President Mbeki also went on to state that he will try to make Mathanzima's dreams a reality. Others who spoke at Mathazima's funeral said they admired how he fought to see the recognition of traditional leaders in South Africa. Former South African President and Kaiser Mathanzima's Uncle, Nelson Mandela, was not in attendance for Mathanzima's funeral because he was in Dublin, Ireland for the opening ceremonies of the 2003 Special Olympics.

Mathanzima's grandson, King Lwandile Zwelenkosi Matanzima, ruler of Western Thembuland of Eastern Cape, died on 22 May 2010.

References

1915 births
2003 deaths
People from Intsika Yethu Local Municipality
Xhosa people
Prime Ministers of Transkei
Presidents of Transkei
University of Fort Hare alumni
University of South Africa alumni
Transkeian independence activists